Santry is a surname. Notable people with the surname include:

 Eddie Santry (1876–1919), American featherweight boxer
 Edward Santry (1861–1899), American baseball player
 Margaret Santry (1904–1975), American journalist and radio host

See also
 Santry (disambiguation)